Qurishkak (also Romanized as Qūrīshkāk) is a village in Chaybasar-e Jonubi Rural District, in the Central District of Maku County, West Azerbaijan Province, Iran.

References 

Populated places in Maku County